Charles Gillespie (born August 26, 1998) is a Canadian actor and singer, known for his role of Luke Patterson in the Netflix series Julie and the Phantoms. He previously acted in shows and films including Charmed, Degrassi: Next Class, The Rest of Us, and Runt.

Early life 
Charles Jeffrey Gillespie was born on August 26, 1998, in Dieppe, New Brunswick, Canada. He has three older brothers and a younger sister.

Gillespie began playing music at a young age, as his mother encouraged him and his siblings to take music lessons. He is able to play guitar, bass, trombone, tuba, piano, violin, and saxophone.

Career 

In 2014, Gillespie made his film debut in Le gang des hors-la-loi. His film and television appearances include Charmed, Degrassi: Next Class, The Rest of Us, and Runt.

In 2019, Gillespie was cast in the role of Luke Patterson in the Netflix musical series Julie and the Phantoms, which premiered in 2020. He stars alongside Jeremy Shada, Owen Joyner, and Madison Reyes. With Reyes, he wrote and performed the song "Perfect Harmony".

Filmography

Discography

Albums

Awards and nominations

References

External links 
 
 

1998 births
Living people
Canadian male television actors
21st-century Canadian male actors
Canadian male film actors
Canadian male child actors